Okahao Constituency is an electoral constituency in the Omusati Region of Namibia. It had 26,035 inhabitants in 2004 and 12,390 registered voters . Its district capital is the settlement of Okahao.

Villages

It is home to Uutsathima Combined School, a school predominantly for San people with 12 teachers and more than 300 pupils.

Politics
Okahao constituency is traditionally a stronghold of the South West Africa People's Organization (SWAPO) party. In the 2015 local and regional elections SWAPO candidate Leonard Shikulo won uncontested and became councillor after no opposition party nominated a candidate. Councillor Shikulo (SWAPO) was reelected in the 2020 regional election. He obtained 4,694 votes, far ahead of the only opposition candidate, Erastus Shipopyeni of the Independent Patriots for Change (IPC, an opposition party formed in August 2020), who obtained 396 votes.

References

Constituencies of Omusati Region
States and territories established in 1992
1992 establishments in Namibia